William Champion Streatfeild (1 September 1865 – 15 February 1929) was the Anglican Bishop of Lewes. He was a descendant of the historic Streatfeild family, the father of the novelist Noel Streatfeild, and appears as the beloved but over-saintly father of the heroine, Victoria, in her autobiographical novel A Vicarage Family.

Biography 
William was the eldest son of the Rev. William Champion Streatfeild (1839–1912) and Selina Frances Diana Leveson-Gower (1840–1916), and was educated at Marlborough and Pembroke College, Cambridge before being ordained in 1890.  His ministry began with a curacy at Sittingbourne under his father-in-law, Henry Venn, after which he was Curate to his own father in Frant, Sussex.  He then began a long period as Incumbent at several Sussex parishes: Amberley (with Houghton), St Leonards-on-Sea from 1902, and Eastbourne (where he was also Rural Dean). He was elevated to the episcopate in December 1928 but only served as bishop for two months until his death.

A small brass memorial to him lies in the north aisle of Chichester Cathedral.

Family
William's father, Rev. William Champion Streatfeild, was the sometime Vicar of Howick, Ryton-on-Tyne, Kings Worthy and Frant.

William married Janet Venn (1873–1952), daughter of Henry Venn, under whom William was curate in Sittingbourne, on 7 September 1893.  Janet was from a strong evangelical family.  Her great grandfather John Venn was one of the founders and her grandfather (Henry Venn) honorary secretary of the Church Missionary Society (CMS).  Her uncle, John Venn was the mathematician famous for Venn diagrams.

Two of William's brothers, Rev Claude Streatfeild (1870–1951) and Rev Roland Harry Streatfeild (1871–1952) were also Church of England Clergymen.  Roland was curate to William in Eastbourne.

One of William's daughters was the children's novelist Noel Streatfeild (1895–1986) and another the artist Ruth Gervis (1894–1988).

William died on 15 February 1929 aged 63 while travelling on the 9.29 train from Lewes to Eastbourne for a dental appointment, three days after his diocesan bishop Winfrid Oldfield Burrows.

Ancestry and descendants

Notes

William
1865 births
People educated at Marlborough College
Alumni of Pembroke College, Cambridge
Bishops of Lewes
1929 deaths
20th-century Church of England bishops
People from Frant